Warrensburg Junior – Senior High School is a high school located in Warrensburg, New York, United States. It holds about 600 students from Grades 7 - 12 and teaches according to the Board of Regents.

References

External links 
Official school website

Public high schools in New York (state)
Schools in Warren County, New York
Public middle schools in New York (state)